The electoral district of Hastings is an electorate of the Victorian Legislative Assembly. It was created prior to the 2002 election due to population increases in Melbourne's outer south east. It covers Hastings, Tyabb, Somerville, Bittern and part of Langwarrin. French Island is also included within the electoral boundary.

The seat is currently held by former actor and TV presenter Paul Mercurio for the Australian Labor Party.

Members for Hastings

Election results

References

External links
 Electorate profile: Hastings, Victorian Electoral Commission

2002 establishments in Australia
Constituencies established in 2002
Electoral districts of Victoria (Australia)
City of Frankston
Mornington Peninsula